Georgina is a genus of grasshoppers in the family Morabidae. There is one described species, Georgina syllophica, found in Australia.

References

Caelifera
Taxa described in 1976